Martensia bibarii is a species of red algae.

References

Species described in 2004
Delesseriaceae